Happy Death Day 2U is a 2019 American science fiction black comedy slasher film written and directed by Christopher Landon. A sequel to 2017's Happy Death Day, it stars Jessica Rothe, Israel Broussard, Suraj Sharma, and Steve Zissis. The film again follows Tree Gelbman (Rothe), now trapped in the same time loop of a different iteration of her world. Jason Blum again serves as a producer through his Blumhouse Productions company.

The film was released in the United States on February 13, 2019, by Universal Pictures. Critics praised Rothe's performance, as well as the film's shift to a more sci-fi tone, although some noted it as derivative of the first film. It grossed $64million worldwide against a $9million budget. A third film, Happy Death Day to Us, is in active development.

Plot
College student Ryan Phan wakes up in his car on September 19. Returning to his dorm room, he walks in on his roommate Carter and Carter's girlfriend, Tree. He resumes work on an experimental quantum reactor with fellow students Samar and Dre to try to slow down time. After Bronson, the school dean, shuts down the project for causing several power outages and has shown to have no practical applications so far, Ryan is murdered by someone dressed as school mascot Babyface and wakes up again on the 19th. Tree explains her experience reliving September 18th, and she and Carter agree to help Ryan. They learn the reactor was responsible for creating the loop. The masked killer tracks Ryan down, but Tree unmasks him to reveal another Ryan. The second Ryan warns that the original must die for the loop to close. Terrified, Ryan activates the reactor, releasing an energy pulse that knocks everyone unconscious.

Tree wakes up in Carter's room on September 18 and relives her original time loop, but she soon realizes things are different after discovering that Carter is now dating a different (yet still annoying) Danielle. Ryan theorizes that the reactor caused Tree to drift into another dimension. When Tree learns her mother is still alive in this new reality, she wants to stay.

That night, Tree goes to the hospital to intercept serial killer John Tombs before he escapes, but she is confronted by a police officer. The killer kills the officer, and Tree runs into Lori at the elevator, realizing Lori is not the killer in this reality. Lori tells Tree that the killer cannot be Tombs because she just took him in for surgery. The killer stabs Lori, then chases Tree to the roof, where she accidentally falls to her death. She wakes at the beginning of her loop and demands that Ryan and his team help her escape it, requiring they test dozens of algorithms. At Carter's suggestion, Tree serves as the group's recorder, killing herself at the end of each day so they can start again. Eventually, her injuries catch up with her, and she faints. Waking up in the hospital, Tree steals a gun to go after Tombs, only to find Lori already dead. Tombs, disguised as Babyface, attacks, and Tree shoots him dead. However, a second Babyface killer appears, forcing Tree to kill herself and the killer.

The group finally discovers the correct algorithm, but a technical issue forces a delay. Faced with a choice of which reality she wants to be in when both time loops close, Tree decides to remain in the current dimension. Carter urges Tree to consider the consequences of living a life that is not truly hers and states that her experience with grief helped shape the person she is now. Tree hides from the killer in a hotel, but that evening, the news reports that Carter was murdered trying to save Lori at the hospital. Tree kills herself by exploding a power station, deactivating the reactor so she can save Carter and Lori. The loop restarts and Tree decides to return to her own reality. She advises Lori to end her affair with her professor Gregory Butler, discovers that Danielle is cheating on Carter, and has a final conversation with her mother.

Bronson confiscates the reactor before the group can activate it. Believing she is too weak to survive another loop, Tree insists they retrieve the device. The group enlists Danielle to distract Bronson while they recover the reactor. As Ryan readies the device, Tree goes to the hospital to rescue Lori from Tombs but is trapped by the second Babyface killer—revealed to be Dr. Butler trying to bury the evidence of his affair with Lori. Dr. Butler's wife Stephanie appears and shoots Lori, revealing she is in league with her husband, but he betrays and kills her as well. In the ensuing confrontation, Tree outsmarts Butler and kills him. Lori survives, and Tree and Carter kiss as the reactor activates, sending Tree back to her original dimension on September 19.

Later, Tree, Carter, Ryan, Samar, and Dre are escorted by agents to a DARPA laboratory, where the reactor has been moved for further experimentation. When the agents say they need a test subject in order to see how the machine works, Tree says she knows the perfect one. In her bedroom, Danielle wakes up, screaming in horror.

Cast

Production

Development
Ahead of the first film's release, director Christopher Landon talked about the possibility of a sequel, focusing on why Tree went into the time loop stating "The whole idea for my sequel is actually already in this movie".

Actress Jessica Rothe in an interview in 2018 stated that while most horror sequels retread the original, Landon's pitch instead "elevates the movie from being a horror movie into a Back to the Future type of genre film where the sequel joins us right from where we left off, it explains a lot of things in the first one that didn't get explained, and it elevates everything."

The sequel was officially announced with filming scheduled to begin on May 10, 2018.

Casting
Most of the original actors returned, including Rothe, Modine, Broussard, and Matthews. In addition, Suraj Sharma and Sarah Yarkin were cast.

Filming
Principal photography on the film began on May 14, 2018, in New Orleans, Louisiana. In November 2018, Ben Baudhuin was confirmed to be the film's editor.

Music
On February 15, 2019, Back Lot Music released the original motion picture soundtrack for the film, with music produced by Bear McCreary. The soundtrack did not feature Lizzo's cover of "Stayin' Alive".

On January 2, 2019, Back Lot Music released a cover of "Stayin' Alive" performed by Lizzo as a stand-alone promotional single for the movie. The song plays throughout the first set of end credits before the post-credit scene.

Release
Happy Death Day 2U was released on February 13, 2019. It was originally scheduled to be released one day later, on Valentine's Day. However, the film was rescheduled after a request from Fred Guttenberg, whose daughter, Jaime was a victim of the Stoneman Douglas High School shooting, which took place exactly one year prior.

The film was released digitally on April 30, 2019, and on Blu-ray and DVD on May 14. Distributor Shout! Factory released both Happy Death Day and Happy Death Day 2U on 4K Ultra HD Blu-Ray on May 31, 2022. The release included a new commentary track with director Christopher Landon and actress Jessica Rothe.

Reception

Box office
Happy Death Day 2U grossed $28.1million in the United States and Canada, and $36.5million in other territories, for a worldwide total of $64.5million, against a production budget of $9million.

In the United States and Canada, Happy Death Day 2U was released alongside Isn't It Romantic, and was projected to gross $17–20million from 3,207 theaters in its opening weekend. Opening without Tuesday night previews, the film made $992,000 on its first day, Wednesday, and $2.7million on Valentine's Day, Thursday, for a two-day total of $3.7million. It went on to debut to $9.8million over the weekend (a five-day total of $13.5million), finishing $3.5million below expectations and fifth at the box office. The film dropped 48% in its second weekend, making $5million and finishing seventh.

Critical response
The website's critical consensus reads, "A funnier follow-up with a sci-fi bent, Happy Death Day 2U isn't as fiendishly fresh as its predecessor, but fans of the original may still find this a sequel worth celebrating." On Metacritic, the film has a weighted average score of 57 out of 100, based on 31 critics, indicating "mixed or average reviews". Audiences polled by CinemaScore gave the film an average grade of "B" on an A+ to F scale, the same score as the first film, while those at PostTrak gave it an average 2.5 out of 5 stars.

Kimber Myers, writing for the Los Angeles Times, said: "Happy Death Day 2U can't quite replicate the feelings of joy and discovery of the original, but Landon deserves credit for varying the tune, while still playing the hits that will please the fans of its predecessor." Meg Downey, critic for IGN, praised the film, grading it an 8.5/10 and writing, "Happy Death Day 2U deserves a healthy amount of praise for pushing its pedal to the metal all the way through. The level of risk-taking is refreshing, even when it's not completely successful at every single turn."

Novelization 
On February 26, 2019, Blumhouse Books released a novelization written by Aaron Hartzler titled Happy Death Day & Happy Death Day 2U, to coincide with the second film's release.

Future 
Regarding the possibility of a third film, writer and director Christopher Landon has stated that he "definitely [has an idea for] the third movie in [his] head", while producer Jason Blum has said that if "enough people see this movie, we're gonna make a third movie, we want to make a third movie". In March 2019, following the film's less-than-projected box office gross, Blum said a third film was "not very [likely] but not impossible". In July 2019, Landon confirmed that a third film is not in development. In August 2019, Landon stated he had an outline written for the third film and believed he would eventually share it in some medium, be it another movie or not. In 2020, Blum said that while other studios would have cancelled a follow-up to Happy Death Day 2U following its financial underperformance, a third movie "is still on my radar in some shape or form". He later clarified that he was hard at work to get a deal done to make the film.

In September 2020, Landon confirmed a third film, tentatively titled Happy Death Day to Us, was in active development, with Rothe reprising her role. In November 2020, Landon stated that an outline for the script was ready to go and was awaiting approval from Universal. In an interview with Screen Rant in February 2023, Landon confirmed he had pitched a third film.

See also
 List of films featuring time loops

References

External links
 

2019 films
2019 comedy horror films
2019 science fiction films
2010s science fiction comedy films
2010s science fiction horror films
2010s serial killer films
2010s slasher films
American black comedy films
American comedy horror films
American films about revenge
American science fiction comedy films
American science fiction horror films
American sequel films
American serial killer films
American slasher films
Blumhouse Productions films
Films about death
Alternate timeline films
Films about parallel universes
Films directed by Christopher B. Landon
Films produced by Jason Blum
Films set in universities and colleges
Films shot in New Orleans
Films with screenplays by Christopher B. Landon
Slasher comedy films
Time loop films
Universal Pictures films
Advertising and marketing controversies in film
Political controversies in film
Film controversies in the United States
Films scored by Bear McCreary
2010s English-language films
2010s American films